Wayne H. Pace (born 1946 or 1947) was the chief financial officer (CFO) and executive vice president of Time Warner. He served as CFO from 2001 until 2007. 

He attended Austin Peay State University where he graduated with a bachelor's degree in accounting and economics and he received a Master of Business Administration from the University of Georgia.

In 2006, Pace was involved in a prostitute scandal in New York City.  He was cleared by his employer, Time Warner, of any wrongdoing by using company funds for the prostitute.

References

External links
 "Time Warner Inc." on Google Finance

Living people
Austin Peay State University alumni
University of Georgia alumni
American chief financial officers
1940s births

20th-century American businesspeople